Motors Liquidation Company (MLC), formerly General Motors Corporation, was the company left to settle past liability claims from Chapter 11 reorganization of American car manufacturer General Motors. It exited bankruptcy on March 31, 2011, only to be carved into four trusts; the first to settle the claims of unsecured creditors, the second to handle environmental response for MLC's remaining assets, a third to handle present and future asbestos-related claims, and a fourth for litigation claims.

Motors Liquidation Company's stock symbol was changed from GMGMQ to MTLQQ, effective July 15, 2009. MTLQQ stock was cancelled. Its unsecured creditors were issued stock for the Motors Liquidation Company General Unsecured Creditors Trust under the symbol MTLQU.

History

Bankruptcy filing

On the morning of June 1, 2009, Chevrolet-Saturn of Harlem, a dealership in Manhattan that was owned by GM itself, filed for bankruptcy protection there, followed in the same court by General Motors Corporation (the main GM in Detroit), GM's subsidiary Saturn LLC, and Saturn LLC's subsidiary Saturn Distribution Corporation. All cases were assigned to Judge Robert Gerber.

The filing by the dealership declared General Motors to be a debtor in possession. The Manhattan dealership's filing allowed General Motors to file its own bankruptcy petition in the United States Bankruptcy Court for the Southern District of New York, its preferred court. Normally for such cases, the company would have filed in the courts located in the state(s) where the company is incorporated, or where it conducts operations, which for Detroit-headquartered General Motors would have been the courts in Michigan or Delaware, where it is incorporated. General Motors' attorneys, however, preferred to file in the federal courts in New York, because those courts have a reputation for expertise in bankruptcy.
In a press conference that began four hours and eighteen minutes after the filing, the GM Chief Executive Officer, Fritz Henderson, stressed that he intended for the bankruptcy process to move quickly.
In addition to Henderson's press conference, President of the United States Barack Obama made a speech from the White House four hours three minutes after the court filing.

Obligation to privately owned individual franchise dealerships
Prior to General Motors bankruptcy filing, U.S. state law governed the minimum required distance between same-franchise dealers; known as the eight-mile rule. The eight-mile rule prohibits same-franchise dealers from locating within eight miles of each other. In 2001 General Motors formally declared Project 2000 would be implemented as part of a brand-channeling strategy designed to consolidate its network of privately owned individual franchise dealerships and reduce the number of locations from 7,300 to 3,800. Project 2000 served as the primary mechanism for combining single-point Buick-Pontiac-GMC dealer locations together forming a single corporate brand division (BPG). Project 2000 also targeted single-point Cadillac-Hummer-Saab dealer locations and allowed single-point Chevrolet and Saturn dealer locations to stand on their own. Project 2000 calculated the fair market value for each individually owned dealer franchise to be $3,000 per vehicle based on total volume from any one of the previous three years. Upon agreement of a fair market value, dealers with interest in selling their franchise rights were free to negotiate with each other, and ultimately execute a buy-sell agreement which contained mutually agreed upon terms and conditions required to legally sell and transfer franchise property and ownership rights. Section 363 of the Federal Bankruptcy Code expedited General Motors Project 2000 efforts to reduce its dealer network and circumvent state and federal criminal laws prohibiting the illegal sale of property, or transfer of ownership by an unauthorized party. Thousands of family-owned, profitable, well-capitalized dealerships were forced to forfeit their franchise rights to a neighboring dealer-competitor selected by General Motors. Compensation has not yet been awarded in cases where individual dealer franchise property and ownership rights were transferred for the purpose of granting such rights to a nearby dealer selected by General Motors. In addition to reports of fraud and theft filed with the police, GM dealers joined to form the Committee to Restore Dealer Rights. The committee to restore dealer rights is responsible for helping draft HR 2743, which asserts the action taken by General Motors to consolidate its dealer network by transferring individual dealer franchise ownership and property without compensation was illegal. HR 2743 remained in committee and it was not reintroduced in the next sessions.

Court schedule and motions
The General Motors bankruptcy case was formally entitled In re General Motors Corp., case number 09-50026 in the Southern District, Manhattan, New York.
General Motors was represented by the New York specialist law firm Weil, Gotshal & Manges. The United States Treasury and an ad hoc group of the bondholders of General Motors Corporation were also represented in court.

One of the first motions filed in court was to void the leases on the seven corporate jets, and corporate aircraft hangar at Detroit Metropolitan Wayne County Airport, which the company said were no longer valuable to the company's business. A GM spokesman said that the company had found itself unable to escape the lease in 2008 when it had tried to.

On June 1, 2009, the court gave interim approval to GM's request to borrow $15 billion as debtor-in-possession financing, the company only having $2 billion cash in hand. The United States Treasury had argued in court that it was the only source of such debtor in possession funding, and that without the money from the loan General Motors would have no option but liquidation. Other motions in the first-day hearing included motions to approve payments to key suppliers and to employees and distributors who are in possession of goods manufactured for General Motors. All motions passed in court without substantial objection.

The case schedule laid out by the court was as follows:
June 19, 2009: Deadline for filing all objections to the sale of General Motors.
June 22, 2009: Deadline for making competing bids in the auction of General Motors' assets.
June 25, 2009: Final hearing on the bankruptcy loan.
July 10, 2009: Deadline for completion of the sale, requested by the U.S. Treasury and General Motors.

Sale of good assets to New GM
GM's assets were sold in a section 363 sale. Because the price that these assets were expected to sell for was very high, there was expected to be only one bidder in the auction, a new company NGMCO Inc. This company had been formed by the United States government with a 60% stake, the federal government of Canada and provincial government of Ontario with a 12% stake, the United Auto Workers and Canadian Auto Workers unions with a 17.5% stake, and the unsecured bondholders of General Motors with a 10% stake. "Old GM" was renamed Motors Liquidation Company.

A creditor meeting, at the New York Hilton, held by the United States Trustee Program, was scheduled for June 3, 2009.

By December 2013, the US government sold the last of its GM stock. By February 2015, the Ontario government sold the last of its 4% stake in GM, and by April 2015, the Canadian federal government sold the last of its own 8% GM stake.

Hummer collapse
On June 1, 2009, GM announced that the Hummer brand would be discontinued. The following day GM announced that it had reached a deal to sell the brand to an undisclosed buyer. Later, on June 2, 2009, the buyer was disclosed to be China-based Sichuan Tengzhong Heavy Industrial Machinery Company Ltd.
Sichuan Tengzhong itself confirmed the deal on their website the same day.
The proposed transaction was scheduled to close in the third quarter of 2009, subject to customary closing conditions and regulatory approvals; financial terms of the agreement were not disclosed.

Chinese regulators refused to allow for the purchase of the brand and GM decided on February 24, 2010, to retire the brand. Despite the failed sale, GM discussed entertaining interest in part of the Hummer brand, subsequently made no effort in that direction, leaving Hummer to close.

Failed sale of Saturn
On June 5, 2009, GM announced that the Saturn brand would be sold to the Penske Automotive Group. GM would continue building the Aura, Outlook and Vue for Penske for two years. However, the Penske deal failed and the Saturn division became defunct.

Sale of Saab to Spyker Cars
On June 16, 2009, it was announced that Koenigsegg and a group of Norwegian investors planned to acquire the Saab brand from General Motors. GM would continue to supply architecture and powertrain technology for an unspecified amount of time. It also becomes the last brand/subsidiary from GM to be sold (Hummer was first, followed by Saturn). The deal failed on November 24, 2009. GM, however, requested Spyker Cars to acquire Saab from MLC a few weeks later. But however, MLC announced it would close Saab on December 19, 2009, although this plan was later reversed. Motors Liquidation Company had until January 7, 2010, for the deadline of the revised bid. The sale of Saab to Spyker was approved on January 26, 2010, and completed on February 23, 2010.

Sale of most assets to New GM
On July 10, 2009, the purchase of the ongoing operational assets and trade name of "old GM" was completed and the purchasing entity, "NGMCO Inc", changed its name to "General Motors Company LLC." The new GM held an IPO on November 17, 2010, that raised an estimated $20.1 billion.

Successful units transferred from MLC to (new) GM

 Buick
 Cadillac
 Chevrolet
 GMC
 GM Daewoo
 Holden
 Holden Special Vehicles
 Opel
 Pontiac
 SAIC-GM
 SAIC-GM-Wuling Automobile
 Vauxhall

Pontiac remained with GM into the new GM, but it was phased out on October 31, 2010. By 2017, Opel and Vauxhall were sold to Groupe PSA. GM retired the Holden brand and wound up Holden's operations by the end of 2020.

MLC exited bankruptcy on March 31, 2011 only to be carved into four trusts; the first to settle the claims of unsecured creditors, RACER Trust, the second to handle environmental response for MLC's remaining assets; a third to handle present and future asbestos-related claims, and a fourth for litigation claims.

References

Further reading
 Goolsbee, Austan D., and Alan B. Krueger. "A retrospective look at rescuing and restructuring General Motors and Chrysler." Journal of Economic Perspectives 29.2 (2015): 3-24. online

External links
 Motors Liquidation Company
 Motors Liquidation Company Claim Agent: Bankruptcy paperwork and related documents
  Assessment of the GM plan of February 17, 2009, presented to the U.S. Government
Bad Design the Driving Force Behind GM's Malaise by Jonathan Glancey, The Guardian, June 1, 2009

Companies traded over-the-counter in the United States
American companies established in 2009
Holding companies established in 2009
Holding companies disestablished in 2011
Companies that filed for Chapter 11 bankruptcy in 2009
General Motors
Great Recession in the United States
2009 establishments in New York (state)
2011 disestablishments in New York (state)